R. maculata may refer to:

 Racotis maculata, a geometer moth
 Rana maculata, a Central American frog
 Rasbora maculata, a ray-finned fish
 Restrepia maculata, an orchid endemic to western South America
 Rhipidia maculata, a crane fly
 Rhodocollybia maculata, a basidiomycete fungus
 Rhoicinaria maculata, a three-clawed spider
 Rhynchostele maculata, a New World plant
 Rimularia maculata, a lichenized fungus
 Rodriguezia maculata, an orchid endemic to Brazil
 Ropalidia maculata, a paper wasp
 Rutpela maculata, a flower longhorn